An election to Leitrim County Council took place on 23 May 2014 as part of that year's Irish local elections. 18 councillors were elected from three electoral divisions by PR-STV voting for a five-year term of office, a reduction of 4 seats compared to 2009.

Fine Gael suffered large seat losses, losing 6 seats, and their previously held overall majority while Fianna Fáil also lost 2 seats. Independents and Sinn Féin both increased their numbers by 2 despite the Council being reduced by 4 seats as a whole.

Results by party

Results by Electoral Area

Ballinamore

Carrick-on-Shannon

Manorhamilton

References

Post-Election Changes
†Ballinamore Sinn Féin Councillor Martin Kenny was elected a TD for Sligo-Leitrim at the Irish general election, 2016. Caroline Gildea was co-opted to fill the vacancy on 14 March 2016.

External links
 Official website

2014 Irish local elections
2014